Antoine Hervé (born 20 January 1959 in Paris) is a French composer and pianist.

Hervé studied composition at the Conservatoire national supérieur de musique. Between 1987 and 1989 he was director of the French National Jazz Orchestra.

Next to musicals, soundtracks for movies and dance shows Hervé has composed a concert for trumpet and a piece for drums and orkest. During 1997 Hervé and Markus Stockhausen founded a quintet.

Works 
Tutti
Soundtrack for Un Monde Sans Pitié by Eric Rochant
Mr. Astaire, Musical
L'Opéra des Pékins
A Chacun Son Serpent
Sonate d'Automne
Mes Bien Chers Frères
Tribute to Miles Davis
La Maison Brûlée
Transit, 1994
Transactions
Mozart, La Nuit, Musical, 1997
Les Caprices De Morgane, Musical, 1997
Macadam-Macadam, Hip-Hop-Ballett, 2000/01
A Chacun Son Serpent, Musical, 2000/01
Absolute Dream

Discography 
Antoine Hervé Trio, 1985 with Michel Benita and Peter Gritz
ONJ 87, 1987
African Dream, 1987
Paris-Zagreb, 1990
Hexameron, 1990 with Vinko Globokar, Louis Sclavis, György Kurtág, Andy Emler.
Invention Is You, 1997
Summertime, 2001
Mozart, La Nuit, 2002
Inside, 2003
I Mean You (Tribute to Thelonious Monk), 2010

References

1959 births
French jazz pianists
French male pianists
French jazz composers
Male jazz composers
Living people
Musicians from Paris
21st-century pianists
21st-century French male musicians
Orchestre National de Jazz members